Shuran may refer to:

Shuran, Chaharmahal and Bakhtiari
Shuran, Lorestan
Suran, Sistan and Baluchestan
Shuran, Tehran